Sistema Huautla is a cave system in the Sierra Mazateca mountains of the southern Mexican state of Oaxaca.  it was the deepest cave system in the Western Hemisphere,  from top to bottom, with over 55 miles of mapped passageways.

Location
Sistema Huautla is a cave system in the Sierra Mazateca mountains in  the Teotitlán District  of the Cañada region in the southern Mexico state of Oaxaca. It is below the municipalities of Huautla de Jimenez, Huautepec and Mazatlan Villa de Flores.
System Huautla is the deepest cave in the Western Hemisphere and the tenth deepest cave in the world; it is listed as the twenty-eighth longest at about 55.3 miles surveyed passage compared to the Mammoth Cave complex at 420+ miles.

History

In 1965 cavers from Austin, Texas exploring the Sierra Mazateca mountains found several large caves; During the 1960s North American cavers subsequently gathered survey data and generated maps which showed their proximity to each other. Over time the Sótano de San Agustin was found to be connected to La Grieta and Nita Nanta, and eight more cave entrances were discovered. It became clear that they belonged to one cave system, Sistema Huautla.  it is known to have 20 entrances.

In an expedition in 1977, the deepest point of the cave system was discovered after staging multiple underground camps, a flooded tunnel at 1325 meters, known as the San Agustín sump. Subsequent scuba diving expeditions in 1979 and 1981 proved logistically insufficient to transport equipment to explore it further. In 1994, during a 135-day expedition of 44 people, mostly from the UK and the US, 11 were cave diving using closed cycle life support systems called rebreathers. They explored three parts of the sump system and discovered an upstream tunnel leading to the only known exit for the water that enters the Huautla caves, the spring of Peña Colorada.
During a two-month expedition in 2013 involving 40 team members from the UK, USA, Canada, Poland and Mexico, cavers entered through Sótano de San Agustin; it took divers three weeks to reach "what looked like a calm, rock-enclosed lake about 100 feet wide", the San Agustín sump. One of them established a new record depth when stopping at 1545 meters. The new survey data gave the cave a total length of 64.2 kilometers. A navigable connection between where water enters Sistema Huautla and where it exits at Peña Colorada has yet to be found.

Since then consecutive annual expeditions have been launched as part of the Proyecto Espeleológico Sistema Huautla (PESH). In 2018, an international team of 24 cavers could not find a connection of the nearby Cueva de La Peña Colorada Sump VII with Sistema Huautla during their two-month long expedition.

Geology
Sistema Huautla is a karst groundwater basin. In 1994, dye tracing established Nita He and Nita Nashi as tributary caves via 1,100-meter-deep flow paths. The western hydrological boundary is the Huautla Santa Rosa Fault, in the East it is the Agua de Cerro Fault and in the North the Plan de Escoba Fault.

See also 
 List of caves
 Speleology
 List of deepest caves

References

Further reading
Sides, A. G., and Sides, H., "Journey Toward the Center of the Earth," The Washington Post Magazine, August 28, 1994, pp. 14–18, 25-27, 
Robert Forrest Burgess. The Cave Divers. Chapter 11 Deepest Quest Aqua Quest Publications, Inc., 1999, 351 pages, ISBN, 1881652114. p 125-153. 
Stone, W. C., am Ende, B., and Paulsen, M., "Beyond the Deep", 2002, Grand Central Publishing, New York, NY, 368 pp, 
C. William Steele, Paul Steward (Editor), and Elizabeth Winkler. "Huautla: Thirty Years in One of the World's Deepest Caves" cavebooks.com/Huautla, 305 pages, 
Tabor, James M. Blind descent : the quest to discover the deepest place on earth. 2010 Random House. 304 pages. 
Jewell, Chris. 2013 "Huautla expedition, San Agustin, Mexico." National Speleological Society News 72.6 (June 2014).p 13-19.
Jewell, Chris. 2013 "San Agustin 2013 expédition." Bulletin of Association for Mexican Cave Studies (AMCS) n°25 (2014), 41 pages .

External links
Proyecto Espeleológico Sistema Huautla (PESH) project of the National Speleological Society and the US Deep Caving Team, a 501 (c) 3 non-profit
Association for Mexican Cave Studies, History

Caves of Mexico
Sierra Madre de Oaxaca
Karst formations of Mexico